Bhubananda Das was an Indian politician. He was a Member of Parliament, representing Odisha in the Rajya Sabha the upper house of India's Parliament as a member of the Indian National Congress.

References

External links
Official biographical sketch in Parliament of India website

Rajya Sabha members from Odisha
Lok Sabha members from Odisha
Indian National Congress politicians
India MPs 1952–1957
1885 births
1958 deaths